Íde is a feminine given name of ancient Irish origin. Prior to the Irish spelling reform, the name was spelt Íte.

St. Íde has her feast day on the 15th of January. Míde is an early pet-form of the name. The name has been anglicised as Ita, Ida or Meeda.

References

Irish-language feminine given names